The Denmark national football team have participated in nine UEFA European Championships, and won the tournament once. Their first tournament was Euro 1964 in which they secured fourth place. In the final of UEFA Euro 1992 in Sweden, Denmark's 2–0 victory over Germany resulted in their first major tournament title.

Overview

Overall record

*Denotes draws including knockout matches decided via penalty shoot-out.
**Gold background colour indicates that the tournament was won.

List of matches

1964 European Nations' Cup

Final tournament

Semi-finals

Third place play-off

Euro 1984

Group stage

Knockout stage

Semi-finals

Euro 1988

Group stage

Euro 1992

Group stage

Knockout stage

Semi-finals

Final

Euro 1996

Group stage

Euro 2000

Group stage

Euro 2004

Group stage

Knockout stage

Quarter-finals

Euro 2012

Group stage

Euro 2020

Group stage

Knockout phase

Round of 16

Quarter-finals

Semi-finals

Goalscorers

References

 
Countries at the UEFA European Championship